Black Reichswehr was the name for the extra-legal paramilitary formations promoted by the German Reichswehr army during the time of the Weimar Republic; it was raised despite restrictions imposed by the Versailles Treaty. The secret organization was dissolved in 1923 upon the failed Küstrin Putsch.

Restrictions on  German military forces after World War I

The Versailles Treaty restricted the numbers of the German army to seven divisions of infantry and three of cavalry, for a total of 100,000 men, and no more than 4,000 officers. Conscription was prohibited, and civilian employees engaged in forest protection, customs inspection and other official duties could not receive military training. The military was to be exclusively devoted to the maintenance of order within German territory and control of the frontiers. The Treaty further prohibited the construction of aircraft, heavy artillery, submarines, capital ships, and tanks, and the production of materials for chemical warfare.  

Naval forces were limited to 15,000 men. The Treaty  also specified the navy could number no more than 6 battleships of no more than 10,000 tons displacement,  6 cruisers (6,000 tons displacement), 6 destroyers (800 tons displacement), and twelve torpedo boats (200 tons displacement), and these ships could only be replaced after twenty years for the first 2 classes of ships, and after fifteen years, for the remaining classes of ships. Article 191 specifically prohibited the production or acquisition of submarines. The Treaty further prohibited the manufacture, import and export of weapons and poison gas.

To maintain these restrictions, the Treaty created an Allied military commission, whose job was to monitor German military activity, known as the Governments of the Principal Allied and Associated Powers.

Circumventing the Versailles Treaty military restrictions
The Reichswehr military organization, as it was reorganized under General Hans von Seeckt and Defence Minister Otto Gessler, evaded these prohibitions through a variety of measures. Safeguarding its secrecy, Gessler and Reichswehr officials denied the organization's existence to the Reichstag and other institutions. After the Third Silesian Uprising, the military, with von Seeckt's knowledge, provided arms to Freikorps members and other paramilitary groups, who, after the end of the hostilities, stashed their weapons away and reorganized as labour battalions under the command of Major Fedor von Bock, comprising about 2,000 service members and further 18,000 reservists, concentrated around the garrison town of Küstrin in Brandenburg. Black Reichswehr paramilitary forces comprised the SA troops of the Nazi Party, Der Stahlhelm organization, and numerous Freikorps like the Marinebrigade Ehrhardt, its Organisation Consul successor or Bund Oberland.

Though constantly denied by the Reichswehr supreme command and the Ministry of Defence, Black Reichswehr forces served in sabotage acts and assaults during the French Occupation of the Ruhr and were responsible for several Feme murders.

References

1919 establishments in Germany
1923 disestablishments in Germany
Military of the Weimar Republic
Paramilitary organisations of the Weimar Republic